Shyam Bahadur Singh (born 11 July 1963) also known as Shyam Bahadur Singh Patel is an Indian politician. He is former Member Of Legislative Assembly from 110th Barharia vidhan Shabha Constituency.

References 

1963 births
Living people
Members of the Bihar Legislative Assembly
Indian politicians